Acanthothecis submuriformis is a species of corticolous (bark-dwelling) lichen in the family Graphidaceae. Found in Brazil, it was formally described as a new species in 2022 by André Aptroot, Robert Lücking, and Marcela Eugenia da Silva M.Cáceres. The type specimen was collected from the Parque Natural Municipal (Porto Velho, Rondônia); here the lichen was found growing on tree bark in primary rainforest.

It has a smooth, ochraceous white thallus lacking a cortex and lacking a prothallus. Its asci are 8-spored, and its ascospores are hyaline, measuring 29–31 by 6–8 μm. The specific epithet refers to the submuriform (somewhat chambered) spores; all spores have between 7 and 9 transverse septa, but of the 8 spores in the ascus, only about 2 have a longitudinal septum.

Acanthothecis submuriformis contains lichexanthone, a lichen product that causes the thallus and ascomata margins to fluoresce yellow when lit with a long-wavelength UV light. This species and Acanthothecis tetraphora are the only species in genus Acanthothecis known to produce lichexanthone.

References

submuriformis
Lichen species
Lichens described in 2022
Lichens of North Brazil
Taxa named by André Aptroot
Taxa named by Robert Lücking
Taxa named by Marcela Cáceres